Local elections took place in Caloocan on May 9, 2022, within the Philippine general election. The voters will elect for the elective local posts in the city: the mayor, vice mayor, three representatives per district, and six councilor per district of the city.

Background 
Incumbent Mayor Oscar "Oca" Malapitan is on third and final term. He will seek a comeback to Congress, running to represent First District again. His party nominated his son, incumbent First District Representative Dale Gonzalo "Along" Malapitan, who is on his second term. Malapitan will be challenged by incumbent Second District Representative Edgar "Egay" Erice, who is on his third and final term. Other candidates for mayoral race in the city are Alejandro "Jun" Anquilan, Rufino "Ruffy Nazareno" Bayon-on, Roman Domasig Jr., and Ronnie "Toto" Malunes.

Incumbent Vice Mayor Luis Macario "Maca" Asistio is on third and final term. He will seek a seat in the Congress, representing the Second District. The position will be contested by First District councilors Karina Teh (Malapitan's running mate for vice mayor) and Christopher "PJ" Malonzo (Erice's running mate who is on his second term), as well as independent candidate Joseph Timbol.

Incumbent First District Representative Dale Gonzalo "Along" Malapitan will run as mayor. He is switching places with his father, Mayor Oscar "Oca" Malapitan, who is on third and final term as local chief executive. He will be challenged by incumbent First District Councilor Marylou "Alou" Nubla-San Buenaventura, and independent candidate Violeta "Violy" Dela Cruz.

Incumbent Second District Representative Edgar "Egay" Erice will run as mayor. His party nominated Jacob Cabochan. He will face prominent figures, including incumbent Vice Mayor Luis Macario "Maca" Asistio, former Representative Mitzi Cajayon-Uy, incumbent Second District Councilors Alexander "Alex" Mangasar and Roberto "Obet" Samson.

The newly created Third District will elect its representative for the first time. The candidates are incumbent First District Councilor Dean Asistio, and former Mayor and First District Representative Enrico "Recom" Echiverri.

Tickets

Administration coalition

Primary opposition coalition

Other coalitions and parties

Results

For Mayor 
Dale Gonzalo "Along" Malapitan defeated his fellow representative, former Vice Mayor Edgar Erice of the second district. Malapitan won over Erice in a tight election.

For Vice Mayor 
Anna Karina Teh-Limsico defeated  Christopher "PJ" Malonzo.

For Representative

First District 
Oscar Malapitan defeated Marylou "Alou" Nubla-San Buenaventura.

Second District 
Mary Mitzi "Mitch" Cajayon-Uy won in a tight election. Cajayon-Uy defeated her rivals, including Roberto Samson and Alexander Mangasar, Luis Macario "Maca" Asistio, and Jacob Cabochan.

Third District 
Dean Asistio won over former Mayor Enrico Echiverri in a tight election.

For Councilors

First District 

|-bgcolor=black
|colspan=5|

Second District 

|-bgcolor=black
|colspan=5|

Third District 

|-bgcolor=black
|colspan=5|

References 

2022 Philippine local elections
Elections in Caloocan
May 2022 events in the Philippines
2022 elections in Metro Manila